Decadent Action was a mock "consumer terrorist group" and "High Street anarchist-guerrilla organisation" (or culture jammers) which argued that only a credit collapse through excessive consumer spending could bring about the end of capitalism. It argued that bringing about excessive inflation through unrestrained consumer spending was the sole lever which could precipitate the economic collapse upon which any revolutionary action is predicated. Therefore it promoted the idea of irresponsible credit and excessive spending on hedonistic pursuits to achieve its goals.

Its manifesto was first published in The Idler magazine and then Stewart Home's Mind Invaders: A Reader in Psychic Warfare, Cultural Sabotage And Semiotic Terrorism (1997). The group was notable for organising the first Phone-in Sick Day, which saw thousands of British Airways and Irish Garda call in sick to work.

See also
Alternative culture
Anti-consumerism
Culture jamming

References

External links
Decadent Action manifesto (archived)
Wired piece on Phone-in Sick Day
AlterNet article

Anti-consumerist groups
Culture jamming